Donald E. Graves (born 1949) is a Canadian historian specializing in modern military history, especially the War of 1812.

On his mother's side Graves comes from an old Loyalist family (Springer) in Hamilton, Ontario. His father was an executive and his mother a poet and artist. He was educated at the University of Saskatchewan and at Carleton University, where he took an MA in history.

He has been employed as a military historian by the Canadian National Historic Sites Service, the National Archives of Canada and the Canadian Department of National Defence. He is currently the director of Ensign Heritage Group, a consulting firm that specializes in military topics and acted as an advisor to government and private historic organizations, and filmmakers in Britain and North America. Graves lives with his author wife, Dianne, near Ottawa.

Graves sat on the U.S. Secretary of the Interior's Advisory Committee on Revolutionary and War of 1812 Battlefield, the Canadian Minister of Heritage's Advisory Committee on the War of 1812 Bicentenary and is an Honorary Historical Consultant to the Royal Armouries of Britain.

Graves is the author, co-author or editor of nearly two dozen books.  Graves's major effort is "The Forgotten Soldiers' Trilogy," three books (Field of Glory, Where Right and Glory Lead, and All Their Glory Past) which cover the major engagements in the northern theatre of the War of 1812.  His work has been widely praised—a review by Jon Latimer in the Times Literary Supplement (13 April 2007) declared that Graves was "probably Canada' foremost military historian." John Elting, reviewing his book, Red Coats and Grey Jackets: The Battle of Chippawa 1814 called it the "definitive analysis" of that engagement as the author "establishes the historical background, describes the opposing armies, brings them into battle, and assesses the results, without wasting a word -- yet his account of the battle combines high colour and exact detail."

Selected bibliography
 Dragon Rampant: The Royal Welch Fusiliers at War, 1793-1815
 Fix Bayonets: The Life and Times of General Sir Thomas Pearson, 1779-1847
 Century of Service: The History of the South Alberta Light Horse
 Another Place, Another Time: A U-boat Officer's Wartime Album (with Werner Hirschmann)
 In Peril on the Sea: The Royal Canadian Navy and the Battle of the Atlantic
 Guns Across the River: The Battle of the Windmill, 1838
 Field of Glory: The Battle of Crysler's Farm, 1813
 South Albertas: A Canadian Regiment at War
 Where Right and Glory Lead! The Battle of Lundy's Lane, 1814 (1999) excerpt and text search
 Redcoats and Grey Jackets: The Battle of Chippawa, 1814 (1996) excerpt and text search
 Normandy 1944: The Canadian Summer (1996) (coauthor Michael Whitby)
 Fighting for Canada: Seven Battles, 1758–1945 (Toronto: Robin Bass Studio, 2000), editor
 First Campaign of An A.D.C.: The War of 1812 Memoir of Lt. William Jenkins Worth, U.S. Army (2012)
 And All Their Glory Past: Fort Erie, Plattsburgh and the Last Battles in the North (2013)
 Blood and Steel 1: The Wehrmacht Archive: Normandy 1944 (2013) excerpt and text search
 Blood and Steel 2: The Wehrmacht Archive: Retreat to the Reich, September to December 1944 (2015) excerpt and text search
 Blood and Steel 3: The Wehrmacht Archive: The Ardennes Offensive, December 1944 to January 1945 (2015) excerpt and text search
 Always Ready: A History of the Royal Regiment of Canada (2017)

Further reading
 James Elliott, "Historian Tells true Stories," The Hamilton Spectator, Sep 7, 2000; online

References

External links
Bibliography

Canadian military historians
Canadian male non-fiction writers
Living people
1949 births